Sunita Lyn Williams (born September 19, 1965) is an American astronaut and United States Navy officer who formerly held the records for most spacewalks by a woman (seven) and most spacewalk time for a woman (50 hours, 40 minutes). Williams was assigned to the International Space Station as a member of Expedition 14 and Expedition 15. In 2012, she served as a flight engineer on Expedition 32 and then commander of Expedition 33.

Early life and education
Sunita Williams, a native of Needham, Massachusetts, was born in Euclid, Ohio, to Mumbai Indian American neuroanatomist Deepak Pandya and Slovene American Ursuline Bonnie (Zalokar) Pandya, who reside in Falmouth, Massachusetts. She was the youngest of three children. Her brother Jay Thomas is four years older and her sister Dina Annad is three years older. Williams's paternal family is from Jhulasan in the Mehsana district in Gujarat, India, while her maternal great-grandmother Mary Bohinc (originally Marija Bohinjec), born in Slovenia, immigrated to the United States as an 11-year-old with her mother, 1891 Slovene emigrant Ursula (Strajhar) Bohinac.

Williams graduated from Needham High School in 1983. She received a Bachelor of Science degree in physical science from the United States Naval Academy in 1987, and a Master of Science degree in engineering management from Florida Institute of Technology in 1995.

Military career
Williams was commissioned an ensign in the United States Navy in May 1987. After a six-month temporary assignment at the Naval Coastal System Command, she was designated a Basic Diving Officer. She next reported to the Naval Air Training Command, where she was designated a Naval Aviator in July 1989. She received initial H-46 Sea Knight training in Helicopter Combat Support Squadron 3 (HC-3), and was then assigned to Helicopter Combat Support Squadron 8 (HC-8) in Norfolk, Virginia, with which she made overseas deployments to the Mediterranean, Red Sea and the Persian Gulf for Operation Desert Shield and Operation Provide Comfort. In September 1992, she was the Officer-in-Charge of an H-46 detachment sent to Miami, Florida, for Hurricane Andrew relief operations aboard . In January 1993, Williams began training at the U.S. Naval Test Pilot School. She graduated in December, and was assigned to the Rotary Wing Aircraft Test Directorate as an H-46 Project Officer and V-22 chase pilot in the T-2. Later, she was assigned as the squadron Safety Officer and flew test flights in the SH-60B/F, UH-1, AH-1W, SH-2, VH-3, H-46, CH-53, and the H-57.

In December 1995, she went back to the Naval Test Pilot School as an instructor in the Rotary Wing Department and as the school's Safety Officer. There she flew the UH-60, OH-6, and the OH-58. Williams was deployed on Saipan in June 1998 when she was selected by NASA for the astronaut program. She has logged more than 3,000 flight hours in more than 30 aircraft types.

Career in NASA 

Williams began her astronaut candidate training at the Johnson Space Center in August 1998.

STS-116 

Williams was launched to the International Space Station (ISS) with STS-116, aboard Space Shuttle Discovery, on December 9, 2006, to join the Expedition 14 crew. In April 2007, the Russian members of the crew rotated, changing to Expedition 15 .

Expeditions 14 and 15 

After launching Williams arranged to donate her pony tail to Locks of Love. Fellow astronaut Joan Higginbotham cut her hair aboard the International Space Station and the ponytail was brought back to Earth by the STS-116 crew. Williams performed her first extra-vehicular activity on the eighth day of the STS-116 mission. On January 31, February 4, and February 9, 2007, she completed three spacewalks from the ISS with Michael López-Alegría. During one of these walks, a camera became untethered, probably because the attaching device failed, and floated off to space before Williams could react.

On the third spacewalk, Williams was outside the station for 6 hours and 40 minutes to complete three spacewalks in nine days. She has logged 29 hours and 17 minutes in four spacewalks, eclipsing the record held by Kathryn C. Thornton for most spacewalk time by a woman. On December 18, 2007, during the fourth spacewalk of Expedition 16, Peggy Whitson surpassed Williams, with a cumulative EVA time of 32 hours, 36 minutes. In early March 2007, she received a tube of wasabi in a Progress spacecraft resupply mission in response to her request for more spicy food. When she opened the tube, which was packaged at one atmospheric pressure, the gel-like paste was forced out in the lower pressure of the ISS. In the free-fall environment, the spicy geyser was difficult to contain.

On April 26, 2007, NASA decided to bring Williams back to Earth on the STS-117 mission aboard Atlantis. Although she did not break the U.S. single spaceflight record that was recently broken by former crew member Commander Michael López-Alegría, she did break the record for longest single spaceflight by a woman. Williams served as a mission specialist and returned to Earth on June 22, 2007, at the end of the STS-117 mission. Poor weather at the Kennedy Space Center in Cape Canaveral forced mission managers to skip three landing attempts there over a 24-hour period. They then diverted Atlantis to Edwards Air Force Base in California, where the shuttle touched down at 3:49 p.m. EDT, returning Williams home after a 192-day stay in space.

Marathon in space 
On April 16, 2007, she ran the first marathon by any person in space. Williams was listed as an entrant for the 2007 Boston Marathon, and completed the distance in four hours and 24 minutes. The other crew members cheered her on and gave her oranges during the race. Williams' sister, Dina Pandya, and fellow astronaut Karen L. Nyberg ran the marathon on Earth, and Williams received updates on their progress from Mission Control. In 2008, Williams participated in the Boston Marathon again.

Expeditions 32 and 33 

Williams was launched from the Baikonur Cosmodrome on July 15, 2012, as part of Expedition 32/33. Her Russian spacecraft Soyuz TMA-05M docked with the ISS for a four-month stay at the orbiting outpost on July 17, 2012. The docking of the Soyuz spacecraft occurred at 4:51 GMT as the ISS flew over Kazakhstan at an altitude of 252 miles. The hatchway between the Soyuz spacecraft and the ISS was opened at 7:23 GMT and Williams floated into the ISS to begin her duties as a member of the Expedition 32 crew. On the Soyuz spacecraft, she was accompanied by Japan Aerospace Exploration Agency (JAXA) astronaut Akihiko Hoshide and Russian cosmonaut Yuri Malenchenko. Williams served as the commander of the ISS during her stay onboard ISS Expedition 33, succeeding Gennady Padalka. She became the commander of the International Space Station on September 17, 2012, being only the second woman to achieve the feat. Also in September 2012, she became the first person to do a triathlon in space, which coincided with the Nautica Malibu Triathlon held in Southern California. She used the International Space Station's own treadmill and stationary bike, and for the swimming portion of the race, she used the Advanced Resistive Exercise Device (ARED) to do weightlifting and resistance exercises that approximate swimming in microgravity. After swimming half a mile (0.8 km), biking 18 miles (29 km), and running 4 miles (6.4 km), Williams finished with a time of one hour, 48 minutes and 33 seconds, as she reported.

She returned to Earth with fellow astronauts Yuri Malenchenko and Akihiko Hoshide on November 19, 2012, touching down in the town of Arkalyk, Kazakhstan.

Commercial Crew program 
In July 2015, NASA announced Williams as one of the first astronauts for U.S. Commercial spaceflights. Subsequently, she has started working with Boeing and SpaceX to train in their commercial crew vehicles, along with other chosen astronauts. In August 2018 she was assigned to the first mission flight, CTS-1, to the International Space Station of Boeing CST-100 Starliner. On April 18, 2022, NASA said that it has not finalized which of the cadre of Starliner astronauts, including Barry Wilmore, Michael Fincke, and Williams, will fly on the Crewed Flight Test mission or the first operational Starliner mission. On June 16, 2022, NASA confirmed that Starliner-CFT will be a two person flight test, consisting of Wilmore and Williams. Sunita Williams would become the first woman to fly on the maiden crewed flight of an orbital spacecraft.

Spacewalks 
, Sunita Williams has made seven spacewalks totaling 50 hours and 40 minutes, at the time putting Williams fifth on the list of most experienced spacewalkers. On August 30, 2012, Williams and JAXA astronaut Akihiko Hoshide ventured outside the ISS to conduct US EVA-18. They removed and replaced the failing Main Bus Switching Unit-1 (MBSU-1), and installed a thermal cover onto Pressurized Mating Adapter-2 (PMA-2).

Personal life

Williams is married to Michael J. Williams, a federal police officer in Texas. The two have been married for more than 20 years, and both flew helicopters in the early days of their careers. They reside together in suburban Houston, Texas. She had a pet Jack Russell terrier named Gorby who was featured with her on the Dog Whisperer television show on the National Geographic Channel on November 12, 2010. In 2012, Williams expressed a desire to adopt a girl from Ahmedabad.

In September 2007, Williams visited the Sabarmati Ashram and her ancestral village of Jhulasan in Gujarat, India. She was awarded the Sardar Vallabhbhai Patel Vishwa Pratibha Award by the World Gujarati Society, the first person of Indian descent who was not an Indian citizen to be presented the award. On October 4, 2007, Williams spoke at the American Embassy School, and then met Manmohan Singh, the then-Prime Minister of India. Williams has also visited Slovenia numerous times. During her stay in October 2014, amongst other things, she paid a visit to the Astronomical Society Vega in Ljubljana. She visited Slovenia again in 2016. Williams has taken a samosa and Carniolan sausage to space in celebration of her Indian and Slovenian heritage.

In June 2017, the Needham Public Schools committee voted to name the town's new elementary school after Williams. In May 2020, Williams addressed more than 500,000 Indian and other international students in the United States in a virtual interview organized by the Student Hub at the Embassy of India, Washington, DC, during the COVID-19 pandemic of 2020.

Williams is a member of the Society of Experimental Test Pilots.

Honors and awards
 Navy Commendation Medal
 Navy and Marine Corps Achievement Medal
 Humanitarian Service Medal
 NASA Spaceflight Medal
 Medal "For Merit in Space Exploration", Government of Russia (2011)
 Padma Bhushan, Government of India (2008)
 Honorary Doctorate, Gujarat Technological University (2013)
 Golden Order for Merits, Government of Slovenia (2013)
Sardar Vallabhbhai Patel Vishwa Pratibha Award

See also
 List of Asian American astronauts
 List of female spacefarers

References

External links

 NASA biography of Sunita Williams August 2018
 Take a tour in ISS with Sunita Williams November 2012
 Pics: Sunita Williams' journey home and beyond

1965 births
Living people
American people of Slovenian descent
Aquanauts
Women astronauts
United States Navy astronauts
Crew members of the International Space Station
Commanders of the International Space Station
American people of Gujarati descent
American Hindus
People from Euclid, Ohio
People from Needham, Massachusetts
United States Naval Academy alumni
Florida Institute of Technology alumni
United States Naval Test Pilot School alumni
United States Navy captains
American test pilots
Aviators from Ohio
American women engineers
Recipients of the Medal "For Merit in Space Exploration"
Recipients of the Padma Bhushan in other fields
American people of Indian descent
American women aviators
Women United States Naval Aviators
Space Shuttle program astronauts
American aviators of Asian descent
Spacewalkers
21st-century American women
Military personnel from Massachusetts